General Dragomirov may refer to:

Abram Dragomirov (1868–1955), Imperial Russian Army general of the cavalry
Mikhail Dragomirov (1830–1905), Imperial Russian Army general of the infantry
Vladimir Dragomirov (1862–1928), Imperial Russian Army general